is one of the earliest international auxiliary languages.

Overview 

It was created by Joseph Schipfer and first published in Wiesbaden.

A mere forty years later, in 1879, Volapük took English for basis. Second, Schipfer's project reflects a new conscience of greater possibilities of the international communication which appeared by the invention of the railway and steam ship. He even recommended that his project be used on these "new means of voyage".

Grammar
 is based on (or a simplification of) French (see French orthography), making heavy (even exclusive) use of respelled French vocabulary, which Schipfer considered to be nearly universal among the educated classes of the world of his time.

Some of its characteristics are:

No articles.
Invariable adjectives.
Adverbs formed by adding  to adjectives.
Nouns were declined.
Capitalization of nouns, as in German.

The declension of nouns works as follows, using  "house" as an example:

Examples

Our Father prayer
No Pera, wia ete Cielu
ta Noma sanctiferii;
ta Royoma Ais arrivii;
ta volonta färerii
com Cielu änsi Terru.
Donne Ais noa Päno quotidien;
pardonne Ais noa offansos,
com pardonnas Aos offanding;
non permette que succombias tantationi;
mä delivre Aos malu.

Numbers from one to ten

A Response to a Dear Friend

: 

German: 

English: Dear friend! I am asking a thousand times for understanding that I haven't responded to your very binding letter in proper time. I could not excuse this mistake if I could not assure you that I have been ill for several months. That is the sole cause for my long silence, and I wish to assure you at the same time that I appreciate the worth of your friendship and goodness, the continuation of which I subserviently ask for, in its entirety. I wish for nothing more dearly than to have an opportunity to be able to give you active proof of this statement, in order to actively show you with what respectful friendship I am, and shall remain, devoted to you. Monday, 28 January 1839, most devoted servant and friend of my most valued friend

Encoding

Bibliography 
 Joseph Schipfer, Prospectus oder ein Paar Worte über die, in der Idee zur Verhütung als scheintodt begraben zu werden, angekündigte allgemeine Communicationssprache, Wiesbaden 1836 (Google)
 Joseph Schipfer, Versuch einer Grammatik für eine allgemeine Communications- oder Weltsprache, Wiesbaden 1839 (LMU)

 The project received the code 417.4"1839” of the Montagu C. Butler Library

References

External links 
 Norbert Michel, "Joseph Schipfer - Träumer oder Humanist", in: Beiträge zur Wallufer Ortsgeschichte, Heft 1, 1993. (requires JavaScript)

Constructed languages
International auxiliary languages
Languages attested from the 1830s
1836 introductions
Languages of Germany
Culture of Hesse